Sercomtel is a local phone and internet service provider in the state of Paraná, Brazil. Its phone service ranges includes landline service, mobile and long distance, and broadband internet service. It was the only public telephone company in Brazil, until it was privatised and sold to the Bordeaux Fundo de Investimento in 2020.

Served areas
Until 2008, Sercomtel had the concession to provide service only in two municipalities (Londrina and Tamarana), even providing service in neighbouring cities.

On 29 January 2009, Sercomtel received authorization from Anatel director council to expand to the entire state of Paraná.

See also

 List of internet service providers in Brazil

References

External links
 Sercomtel

Telecommunications companies of Brazil
Internet service providers of Brazil
Mobile phone companies of Brazil
Companies based in Paraná (state)
Telecommunications companies established in 1965
1965 establishments in Brazil